Paul Mark Cobb (born 13 December 1972) is an English former professional footballer who played as a forward in the Football League for Leyton Orient and for a number of teams in non-League football, most notably Dagenham & Redbridge.

At age seventeen, Cobb joined the Thurrock football club for the 1993-1994 football season.

References

1972 births
Living people
People from Aveley
English footballers
Association football forwards
Thurrock F.C. players
Leyton Orient F.C. players
Enfield F.C. players
Dagenham & Redbridge F.C. players
Canvey Island F.C. players
East Thurrock United F.C. players
Heybridge Swifts F.C. players
Braintree Town F.C. players
Tilbury F.C. players
English Football League players
National League (English football) players